Campbell Nicholas Barry (born 1991) is a New Zealand local-body politician. He has served as Mayor of Lower Hutt since 2019.

Biography

Early life
Barry was educated at Wainuiomata High School. He went on to study at Victoria University of Wellington, graduating with a Bachelor of Arts degree in 2018.

Political career
At the 2013 local body elections, Barry was elected a member of the Hutt City Council for the Wainuiomata ward and was re-elected in 2016. He was the youngest person ever to be elected onto the city council.

Andersen won the selection.

In June 2017, Barry raised a motion to abolish ratepayer-funded meals for city councillors at long meetings, as he believed elected members should pay for their own meals after the Council decided to introduce what he called "a sham Living Wage Policy". After a 7–6 vote, with mayor Ray Wallace voting in favour of retaining the meals, a public backlash engulfed the Council in controversy.

At the 2019 local-body elections, Barry was elected mayor of Lower Hutt, beating the incumbent Ray Wallace by 15,453 votes to 13,034. At 28, he was the youngest person ever elected to the office of mayor of a city in New Zealand.

In July 2020 his council secured funding from the government to rebuild the Naenae pool, fulfilling a campaign promise. The council co-funded the project. In September of the same year the council passed a change to the city's rubbish collection system.

On 15 May 2021, Barry opened Lower Hutt's first Dog Park. Named after veteran animal control officer, Les Dalton. Barry said at the opening "It was a real privilege to open the park alongside Les’ wife Jill. As everyone said, Les would be extremely excited and proud to see the park open today," 

In May 2021, Barry was elected as the new chair of Wellington Water, replacing the outgoing Chair David Bassett who had held the role since the establishment of Wellington Water in 2014.

Footnotes

References

External links
 

1991 births
Living people
People from Lower Hutt
Victoria University of Wellington alumni
Mayors of Lower Hutt
Hutt City Councillors
New Zealand Labour Party politicians
21st-century New Zealand politicians
People educated at Wainuiomata High School